Liu Shanshan (born 16 March 1992) is a Chinese football defender who plays on the China women's national football team and for Beijing BG Phoenix of the Chinese Women's Super League.

Career
Liu began football training when she was 5, following her father who had also been a footballer. She attended Hebei Normal University and played for China at the 2012 FIFA U-20 Women's World Cup.

On 8 December 2012, Liu made her debut for the China women's national football team, in a 4–0 defeat by the United States at Ford Field, Detroit.

At the 2015 FIFA Women's World Cup, 23-year-old Liu entered the tournament with 33 caps and was one of the more experienced members of the Chinese squad.

See also
 List of women's footballers with 100 or more caps

References

External links 

 
 

1992 births
Living people
Chinese women's footballers
China women's international footballers
2015 FIFA Women's World Cup players
Footballers at the 2016 Summer Olympics
Sportspeople from Baoding
Footballers from Hebei
Women's association football defenders
Footballers at the 2014 Asian Games
Olympic footballers of China
2019 FIFA Women's World Cup players
FIFA Century Club
Asian Games competitors for China
21st-century Chinese women